Aurora Gil (born in Tijuana, Baja California, Mexico), is a Mexican actress, best known  for her role as Josefina Aguilar in Telemundo's series Señora Acero. Previously she had a recurring role in the HBO series Capadocia. Her most recent work was in La usurpadora, remake of the 1998 telenovela of the same name, and where she played Teresa Bernal. Gil studied acting at the Center for the Performing Arts of the Northwest of the INBA, and also studied performing arts at the center of Argos Comunicación; Casazul. In 2016 she obtained her first nomination at the Your World Awards for Best Super Series Actress, but she was not a winner.

Filmography

Film roles

Television roles

References

External links

Living people
Mexican telenovela actresses
Mexican film actresses
Mexican female models
21st-century Mexican actresses
People from Tijuana
Actresses from Baja California
Year of birth missing (living people)